Inner space may mean:

Entertainment
 Taylor's Inner Space (1974), a television series by Ron and Valerie Taylor
 Innerspace (1987), a sci-fi comedy film
 Operation: Inner Space (1994), a computer game
 InnerSPACE (2009—2018), a Canadian television show
 Innerspace (video game) (2018), an adventure video game

Places
 Adventure Thru Inner Space, a 1967 attraction at Disneyland
 Inner Space Cavern, a Karst cave in Georgetown, Texas, USA

Music
 Inner Space (album) (1973), an album by Chick Corea
 Can (album) (a.k.a. Inner Space) (1979), an album by Can
 "Innerspace", a song by The Apples in Stereo on their album Fun Trick Noisemaker (1995)

Technology
Priam InnerSpace, a hard disk drive series by Priam Corporation in the 1980s

Spirituality
Inner space (spirituality), a central conception within spirituality, as opposed to outer space

See also 
 Inner product space, a kind of vector space in linear algebra
 Lumen (anatomy), an inner space, lining, or cavity
 Outer space (disambiguation)